Hunt is a populated place situated on the Little Colorado River at the mouth of Concho Creek in Apache County, Arizona, United States. It is named after Colonel James Hunt, who served at Fort Apache in the 1870s.

References

Populated places in Apache County, Arizona